This is a list of commanders of the 1st Infantry Division of the United States Army.

Commanding Officers
 MG William L. Sibert June – December 1917
 MG Robert L. Bullard December 1917 – July 1918
 MG Charles P. Summerall July – October 1918
 BG Frank Parker October – November 1918
 MG Edward F. McGlachlin Jr. November 1918 – September 1919
 MG Charles P. Summerall October 1919 – June 1921
 MG David C. Shanks July – November 1921
 MG Charles T. Menoher November 1921 – January 1922
 MG Harry C. Hale February – December 1922
 BG William S. Graves December 1922 – July 1925
 BG Preston Brown July 1925 – January 1926
 BG Frank Parker January – May 1926
 BG Hugh A. Drum May 1926 – May 1927
 MG Fox Conner May – September 1927
 BG Hugh A. Drum September 1927 – January 1930
 BG William Payne Jackson January – March 1930
 MG Briant H. Wells March – September 1930
 BG Lucius R. Holbrook October 1930 – November 1935
 BG Charles DuVal Roberts November 1935 – February 1936
 MG Frank Parker February – March 1936
 MG Stanley H. Ford March – October 1936
 BG Perry L. Miles October 1936 – October 1937
 COL William P. Ennis November – December 1937
 BG Laurence Halstead December 1937 – January 1938
 MG Walter C. Short October 1938 – September 1939
 MG Karl Truesdell October 1939 – December 1940
 MG Donald C. Cubbison January 1941 – May 1942
 MG Terry Allen May 1942 – August 1943
 MG Clarence R. Huebner August 1943 – December 1944
 MG Clift Andrus December 1944 – May 1946
 MG Frank W. Milburn June 1946 – May 1949
 BG Ralph J. Canine May–September 1949
 MG John E. Dahlquist September 1949 – July 1951
 MG Thomas S. Timberman July 1951 – December 1952
 MG Charles T. Lanham January 1953 – June 1954
 MG Guy S. Meloy, Jr. June 1954 – December 1955
 MG Willis S. Matthews January 1956 – April 1957
 MG David H. Buchanan April 1957 – October 1958
 BG Forrest Caraway October 1958 – December 1958
 MG Harvey H. Fischer December 1958 – January 1960
 BG John A. Seitz January 1960 – February 1960
 MG Theodore W. Parker February 1960 – May 1961
 BG John A. Berry, Jr. May 1961 – June 1961
 BG William B. Kunzig July 1961 – August 1961
 MG John F. Ruggles August 1961 – January 1963
 MG Arthur W. Oberbeck January 1963 – January 1964
 MG Jonathan O. Seaman February 1964 – March 1966
 MG William E. DePuy March 1966 – December 1966
 MG John H. Hay, Jr. January 1967 – February 1968
 MG Keith L. Ware February–September 1968
 MG Orwin C. Talbott September 1968 – August 1969
 MG Albert E. Milloy August 1969 – February 1970
 BG John Q. Henion March 1970 – April 1970
 MG Robert R. Linvill April 1970 – January 1971
 MG Edward M. Flanagan, Jr. January 1971 – December 1972
 MG G. J. Duquemin January 1973 – August 1974
 MG Marvin D. Fuller August 1974 – May 1976
 MG Calvert P. Benedict May 1976 – May 1978
 MG Phillip Kaplan May 1978 – July 1980
 MG Edward A. Partain July 1980 – December 1982
 MG Neal Creighton, Sr. December 1982 – June 1984
 MG Ronald L. Watts June 1984 – April 1986
 MG Leonard P. Wishart III April 1986 – July 1988
 MG Gordon R. Sullivan July 1988 – July 1989
 MG Thomas Rhame July 1989 – August 1991
 MG William W. Hartzog August 1991 – July 1993
 MG Josue Robles, Jr. July 1993 – June 1994
 MG Randolph W. House June 1994 – February 1996
 MG Montgomery Meigs March 1996 – July 1997
 MG David L. Grange August 1997 – August 1999
 MG John P. Abizaid August 1999 – September 2000
 MG Bantz J. Craddock September 2000 – August 2002
 MG John R.S. Batiste August 2002 – June 2005
 MG Kenneth W. Hunzeker June 2005 – August 2006
 MG Carter F. Ham August 2006 – August 2007
 MG Robert E. Durbin July 2007 – July 2008
 BG Perry L. Wiggins July 2008 – April 2009
 MG Vincent K. Brooks April 2009 – May 2011
 MG William C. Mayville May 2011 – May 2013
 MG Paul E. Funk II May 2013 – July 2015
 MG Wayne W. Grigsby Jr. July 2015 – September 2016
 BG Pat Frank September 2016 (interim)
 MG Joseph M. Martin October 2016 – June 2018
 MG John S. Kolasheski June 2018 – August 2020
 BG John W. O'Connor Jr. August 2020 (interim)
 MG Douglas A. Sims II August 2020 – May 2022
 MG John V. Meyer III May 2022 – present

References

Lists of United States military unit commanders
United States Army officers
Infantry divisions of the United States Army